The Men's 3000 metres steeplechase event at the 2011 European Athletics U23 Championships was held in Ostrava, Czech Republic, at Městský stadion on 15 and 17 July.

Medalists

Results

Final
17 July 2011 / 17:40

Intermediate times:
1000m: 2:55.80 Patrick Nasti 
2000m: 5:49.20 Eric Senorski

Heats
Qualified: First 4 in each heat (Q) and 4 best performers (q) advance to the Final

Summary

Details

Heat 1
15 July 2011 / 11:45

Intermediate times:
1000m: 2:56.17 Alexandru Ghinea 
2000m: 5:57.95 Alexandru Ghinea

Heat 2
15 July 2011 / 12:00

Intermediate times:
1000m: 2:53.13 Eric Senorski 
2000m: 5:49.02 Eric Senorski

Participation
According to an unofficial count, 24 athletes from 14 countries participated in the event.

References

3000 metres steeplechasechase
Steeplechase at the European Athletics U23 Championships